Boyceville Municipal Airport,  is a village owned public use airport located in the central business district of Boyceville, Wisconsin, a village in Dunn County, Wisconsin, United States. It is included in the Federal Aviation Administration (FAA) National Plan of Integrated Airport Systems for 2021–2025, in which it is categorized as a basic general aviation facility.

Although most airports in the United States use the same three-letter location identifier for the FAA and International Air Transport Association (IATA), this airport is assigned 3T3 by the FAA but has no designation from the IATA.

Facilities and aircraft 
Boyceville Municipal Airport covers an area of 148 acres (60 ha) at an elevation of 967 feet (295 m) above mean sea level. It has one runway: 8/26 is 3,299 by 60 feet (1,006 x 18 m) with an asphalt surface.

For the 12-month period ending July 30, 2021, the airport had 10,750 aircraft operations, an average of 29 per day: 96% general aviation, 4% military and less than 1% air taxi.
In January 2023, there were 20 aircraft based at this airport: all 20 single-engine.

See also
List of airports in Wisconsin

References

External links 
Boyceville Municipal at Wisconsin DOT Airport Directory
 

Airports in Wisconsin
Buildings and structures in Dunn County, Wisconsin
Airports in Dunn County, Wisconsin